Suzanne Davis may refer to:
 Suzanne Davis (pianist) (born 1953), American jazz pianist
 Suzanne Davis (actress) (born 1978), American comedian and actress
 Suzanne Davis (figure skater) (1912–1991), American figure skater
 Suzanne Allison Davis, president of Greenville University